The Laramie County Milk Producers Cooperative Association, at 1122 W. 23rd St. in Cheyenne, Wyoming, was built in 1923.  It was listed on the National Register of Historic Places in 2003.

In 2002 it was the home of "Antiques Central".  It is a two-story brick masonry factory/warehouse with a flat roof.  It originally consisted of a north half  in plan and a south half  in plan, built on a raised concrete foundation with a full basement.

References

Warehouses in the United States
National Register of Historic Places in Laramie County, Wyoming
Buildings and structures completed in 1923